Brendan Rhim (born December 19, 1995) is an American cyclist, who currently rides for UCI Continental team .

Major results

2013
 1st  Overall Tour de l'Abitibi
2014
 6th Bucks County Classic
2017
 3rd Road race, National Under-23 Road Championships
2018
 2nd Overall Joe Martin Stage Race
1st Stage 3 (ITT)
 6th Slag om Norg
2019
 1st  Overall Tour de Beauce
1st  Points classification
 3rd Winston-Salem Cycling Classic
 10th Chrono Kristin Armstrong

References

External links

1995 births
Living people
American male cyclists
American track cyclists